Luis Alberto Perea Pérez (born 3 September 1986) is a Colombian professional footballer who plays as a striker for Salvadoran club FAS.

Career

Early career
Perea moved with his father to Miami, Florida from Colombia at age 12 and attended Miami Sunset High School. He graduated in 2004, while winning a state title and being selected to the All-State team that same year.

He made his professional debut with Atlético Nacional in 2006, aged 19. For the 2007-I season, he was loaned out to La Equidad, and for the second half of the 2007 season, he played with Llaneros. In the 2008 season he was loaned out again, this time to Real Cartagena. At the conclusion of the 2009 Apertura, he left Nacional.

In the 2009 Clausura, he joined Deportes Tolima. For the 2010 season he was loaned out to Peruvian Segunda División club León de Huánuco.

Univ. San Martín
In late 2011, Perea signed with Peruvian Primera División side Universidad San Martín de Porres ahead of the 2012 season. On 20 February 2012, after Perea and several other San Martín players went on strike, the club announced it would not participate in the upcoming season and that the contracts of its players would be terminated.

FC Dallas
On 13 March 2012, Perea returned to the United States and signed with Major League Soccer side FC Dallas. Perea made two appearances for Dallas before he and the club agreed to the mutual termination of his contract on 4 April.

Return to San Martín
After leaving FC Dallas, Perea re-signed with Universidad San Martín, which had resumed operations in time to participate in the new season. On 14 April 2012, Perea made an exceptional debut for San Martín, scoring a hat-trick after coming on as a half-time substitute in a 5–1 win over Juan Aurich. He went on to score 11 goals in 29 appearances that season, including 20 starts.

In 2013, Perea scored 14 goals for San Martín in 36 appearances, including 29 starts.

In 2014, Perea scored 11 goals in 27 appearances in league play, including 24 starts. He was also instrumental in San Martín's run to the finals of the Copa Inca that year, becoming the competition's top scorer with 12 goals in 14 appearances. This included a second-half injury time penalty which turned out to be the decisive goal in a 3–1 comeback win over Melgar, a win that clinched San Martín's place in the final. In the final against Alianza Lima Perea scored the opening goal, a 16th-minute penalty, before being sent off in the 40th minute for a second yellow card. Alianza went on to win the match on penalties.

Orsomarso
On 17 September 2017, Perea made one appearance for Colombian Primera B club Orsomarso, playing 90 minutes in a 1–1 draw against Valledupar.

FAS
On 30 December 2017, Perea signed with Salvadoran Primera División side FAS. On 3 February 2018, Perea scored his first goal for FAS, a 25th-minute penalty in a 1–0 win over Dragón. The following week, he notched his first goal from open play against defending Apertura champions Alianza.

Perea finished the season as top scorer of the 2018 Clausura with 14 goals in 18 appearances, and scored another goal in FAS's playoff series against Audaz.

La Equidad
In June 2018 Perea returned to Colombia, signing with Categoría Primera A club La Equidad.

HFX Wanderers
On 25 February 2019, Perea signed with Canadian Premier League side HFX Wanderers. He made his debut in the Wanderer's home opener against Forge FC on May 4, 2019. He scored his first goal in the same match, the match winner in a 2-1 victory. On 14 December 2019, the club announced that Perea would not be returning for the 2020 season.

Carlos Stein
On 30 December 2019, Perea joined newly-promoted Peruvian Primera División side Carlos Stein. He made five appearances that season, scoring one goal.

Return to FAS
In April 2020, Perea returned to FAS for the 2020 Apertura season. He made his return debut on 25 October 2020 in a 0–0 draw against Once Deportivo.

Personal life
Perea is the son of Luis Carlos Perea, a professional footballer who played in Categoría Primera A and the Mexican Primera División as well as for the Colombia national team.

Career statistics

Honours

Club
FAS
Salvadoran Primera División: Clausura 2021

Individual
Copa Inca Top Scorer: 2014
Salvadoran Primera División Clausura Top Scorer: 2018

References

External links
 

1986 births
Living people
Association football forwards
Colombian footballers
Footballers from Medellín
Colombian expatriate footballers
Expatriate footballers in Venezuela
Colombian expatriate sportspeople in Venezuela
Expatriate footballers in Peru
Colombian expatriate sportspeople in Peru
Expatriate footballers in Ecuador
Colombian expatriate sportspeople in Ecuador
Expatriate footballers in Chile
Colombian expatriate sportspeople in Chile
Expatriate soccer players in the United States
Colombian expatriate sportspeople in the United States
Expatriate footballers in Brazil
Colombian expatriate sportspeople in Brazil
Expatriate footballers in El Salvador
Colombian expatriate sportspeople in El Salvador
Expatriate soccer players in Canada
Colombian expatriate sportspeople in Canada
Atlético Nacional footballers
La Equidad footballers
Llaneros de Guanare players
Real Cartagena footballers
Deportes Tolima footballers
León de Huánuco footballers
S.D. Quito footballers
Everton de Viña del Mar footballers
Club Deportivo Universidad de San Martín de Porres players
FC Dallas players
Criciúma Esporte Clube players
Sport Huancayo footballers
Sport Rosario footballers
Orsomarso S.C. footballers
C.D. FAS footballers
HFX Wanderers FC players
FC Carlos Stein players
Categoría Primera A players
Categoría Primera B players
Peruvian Primera División players
Ecuadorian Serie A players
Primera B de Chile players
Major League Soccer players
Primera División de Fútbol Profesional players
Canadian Premier League players